Piz Varuna (3,453 m) is a mountain in the Bernina Range of the Alps, located on the border between Italy and Switzerland. It lies east of Piz Palü, between the Val Poschiavo and the Val Malenco.

References

External links

 Piz Varuna on Hikr

Bernina Range
Mountains of the Alps
Alpine three-thousanders
Mountains of Graubünden
Mountains of Lombardy
Italy–Switzerland border
International mountains of Europe
Mountains of Switzerland
Poschiavo